Yours Are the Only Ears (stylized as Yours Are The Only Ears) is the stage name of New York musician Susannah Cutler.

Early life
Cutler grew up in New York. Her parents were both musicians, with her father a blues musician and her mother a country musician. Cutler studied both visual arts and textile design in school.

Career
Cutler released her first album under the moniker Yours Are the Only Ears in 2018, titled Knock Hard, after having signed with Team Love Records. In addition to making music, Cutler is also a textile designer.

Discography

Studio albums
 Knock Hard (2018, Team Love)

References

Musicians from New York City
American folk musicians